Mary Cameron Neuhauser (born August 27, 1934) is an American lawyer and former politician.

Born in New York City, Neuhauser received her bachelor's degree from Radcliffe College and her law degree from University of Iowa College of Law. She practiced law in Iowa City, Iowa, served on the Iowa City Council, and was the mayor of the city. Neuhauser was initially a Republican but became a Democrat because of the Watergate Scandal. As a Democrat, Neuhauser served in the Iowa House of Representatives from 1987 to 1995 and then in the Iowa Senate from 1995 to 1999.

Notes

1934 births
Living people
Politicians from New York City
Politicians from Iowa City, Iowa
Radcliffe College alumni
University of Iowa College of Law alumni
Iowa lawyers
Iowa Democrats
Iowa Republicans
Iowa city council members
Mayors of places in Iowa
Women state legislators in Iowa
Members of the Iowa House of Representatives
Iowa state senators
Women city councillors in Iowa
Women mayors of places in Iowa